Ten City (derived from intensity) is an American, Chicago, Illinois-based R&B and house music act, that enjoyed a number of club hits and Urban radio hits in the late 1980s and early 1990s and was one of the first exponents of deep house.

Biography
Formerly known as Ragtyme, the group comprised vocalist Byron Stingily, guitarist Herb Lawson and keyboardist Byron Burke and were augmented by producer Marshall Jefferson. The group was signed by Atlantic Records and released the album Foundation in 1989, which became the group's only album to cross over, peaking at No. 49 on the US Top R&B/Hip-Hop Albums chart.

Ten City is best known for the singles "Devotion", "Right Back to You" and "That's the Way Love Is," which hit No. 1 on the US dance chart and No. 8 on the UK Top 40 in 1989. Stingily, who left the group and became a successful solo artist, re-recorded the song and brought it back to No. 1 on the US dance chart in 1999.

In 2021, Stingily teamed up with producer Marshall Jefferson to release "Be Free" on Ultra Music, the first single in 25 years to be credited to Ten City. Its parent album, "Judgment", was nominated for a Grammy Award that year in the category of Best Dance/Electronic Album.

Discography

Studio albums

Compilation albums
 The Best of Ten City (Ibadan, 2001)

Singles

See also
 List of number-one dance hits (United States)
 List of artists who reached number one on the U.S. dance chart

References

External links
 
 
 Byron Stingily 2012 Audio Interview at Soulinterviews.com

American house music groups
Musical groups from Chicago
American contemporary R&B musical groups
American dance music groups
American house musicians
Atlantic Records artists
Columbia Records artists